Yesaul is a rural locality (a selo) in Chernushinsky District, Perm Krai, Russia. The population was 317 as of 2010. There are 6 streets.

Geography 
Yesaul is located 32 km southeast of Chernushka (the district's administrative centre) by road. Bizyar is the nearest rural locality.

References 

Rural localities in Chernushinsky District